Alexander Ivanovich Korolyuk (born January 15, 1976) is a Russian former professional ice hockey winger who played in the National Hockey League (NHL) with the San Jose Sharks before playing the remainder of his career in the Kontinental Hockey League (KHL).

Korolyuk was drafted in the sixth round, 141st overall, by the San Jose Sharks in the 1994 NHL Entry Draft.

Playing career
As a youth, Korolyuk played in the 1990 Quebec International Pee-Wee Hockey Tournament with a team from Moscow.

Korolyuk was drafted 141st overall by the San Jose Sharks in 1994 NHL Entry Draft, from PHC Krylya Sovetov.

Three years later, he jumped to the NHL, making the opening night roster for the Sharks. However, he spent the majority of that season playing in the American Hockey League. Differences with then-head coach Darryl Sutter caused Korolyuk to be a contract hold-out at the start of the 2000–01 NHL season. He would eventually play 70 games for the Sharks that season. Korolyuk only played 32 games the next season and left the team after continued problems with Sutter. He played all of 2002–03 with Ak Bars Kazan.

While playing in Russia, Sutter was fired, paving the way for his return to the Sharks in 2003–04. Playing primarily on the second line with Alyn McCauley and Nils Ekman, Korolyuk posted a career-high 37 points.

That would be his final season in the NHL, however, as Korolyuk returned to Russia during the 2004–05 NHL lockout. On 1 October 2006, his rights were traded to the New Jersey Devils, along with Jim Fahey, for Vladimir Malakhov and a first-round draft pick. Later that season, Korolyuk became interested in an NHL return and requested to Devils management that his rights be traded back to the Sharks. His request was granted and the Sharks re-acquired him 16 February 2007 for a third-round draft pick, only to have the trade voided six days later when Korolyuk did not report for his physical in the allotted time period.

Korolyuk continued his playing career in the Kontinental Hockey League, playing for HC Vityaz, Atlant Mytishchi, SKA St. Petersburg, Lokomotiv Yaroslavl, Neftekhimik Nizhnekamsk, Metallurg Magnitogorsk and HC Yugra.

Career statistics

Regular season and playoffs

International

Awards and honours

References

External links

1976 births
Ak Bars Kazan players
Atlant Moscow Oblast players
HC Khimik Voskresensk players
Ice hockey players at the 2006 Winter Olympics
Ice hockey people from Moscow
Kentucky Thoroughblades players
Krylya Sovetov Moscow players
Living people
Lokomotiv Yaroslavl players
Manitoba Moose (IHL) players
Metallurg Magnitogorsk players
HC Neftekhimik Nizhnekamsk players
Olympic ice hockey players of Russia
Russian ice hockey right wingers
San Jose Sharks draft picks
San Jose Sharks players
SKA Saint Petersburg players
HC Vityaz players
HC Yugra players